Tupelo is a town in Jackson County, Arkansas, United States. The population was 180 at the 2010 census.

Geography
Tupelo is located at  (35.391629, -91.229278).

Demographics

As of the census of 2000, there were 177 people, 76 households, and 50 families residing in the town.  The population density was 220.5/km (568.5/mi2).  There were 93 housing units at an average density of 115.8/km (298.7/mi2).  The racial makeup of the town was 99.44% White, 0.56% from other races.  1.69% of the population were Hispanic or Latino of any race.

There were 76 households, out of which 22.4% had children under the age of 18 living with them, 55.3% were married couples living together, 6.6% had a female householder with no husband present, and 32.9% were non-families. 27.6% of all households were made up of individuals, and 15.8% had someone living alone who was 65 years of age or older.  The average household size was 2.33 and the average family size was 2.80.

In the town, the population was spread out, with 22.0% under the age of 18, 6.2% from 18 to 24, 29.9% from 25 to 44, 23.7% from 45 to 64, and 18.1% who were 65 years of age or older.  The median age was 37 years. For every 100 females, there were 96.7 males.  For every 100 females age 18 and over, there were 100.0 males.

The median income for a household in the town was $27,614, and the median income for a family was $28,750. Males had a median income of $24,375 versus $14,750 for females. The per capita income for the town was $12,301.  About 13.3% of families and 23.4% of the population were below the poverty line, including 26.1% of those under the age of 18 and 25.0% of those 65 or over.

Education
It is in the Newport School District.

References

Towns in Jackson County, Arkansas
Towns in Arkansas